John Pratt Hungerford (January 2, 1761 – December 21, 1833) was an 18th- and 19th-century politician and lawyer from Virginia. He served two terms in the  U.S. House of Representatives from 1813 to 1817. Previously, he had served in the House in 1811, but was removed from office after his election results were called into question by a House investigation.

Biography
Born in Leeds, Virginia, Hungerford received an elementary education under private teachers as a child. He studied law and was admitted to the bar.

War service and state legislative career 
He served in the Revolutionary War and later became a member of the Virginia House of Delegates, serving from 1797 to 1801 and from there to the Virginia State Senate, serving from 1801 to 1809.

Hungerford served in the War of 1812 as a brigadier general of militia and later returned to the House of Delegates, serving again from 1823 to 1830.

Contested elections to Congress 
His first two elections to the United States Congress required lengthy investigations and official rulings as to the legitimacy of the elections. In 1811, he was seated as a Democratic-Republican member in the United States House of Representatives, having won his election by only 6 votes. The election was contested by his opponent, John Taliaferro, and the House initiated a review. After the initial House committee ruled in Hungerford’s favor, the House itself decided that many ineligible voters had voted, which resulted in Hungerford’s removal from office. The resulting vote tally from the election gave Taliaferro a majority of 121 votes. In the next congressional election in 1812, Hungerford was again elected to the House, and his opponent again filed a protest, this time based upon a technicality involving the manner in which names were recorded on the voter rolls. This time, the investigative committee ruled against Hungerford, but the entire House once again overruled the committee, declaring Hungerford the winner. 

He then served two terms from 1813 to 1817.

Death 
He died at "Twiford" in Westmoreland County, Virginia on December 21, 1833, and was interred in Hungerford Cemetery in Leedstown, Virginia.

References

External links 

1761 births
1833 deaths
American militia generals
American militiamen in the War of 1812
Continental Army soldiers
Members of the Virginia House of Delegates
Virginia lawyers
Virginia state senators
Democratic-Republican Party members of the United States House of Representatives from Virginia
People from Westmoreland County, Virginia
19th-century American lawyers
Members of the United States House of Representatives removed by contest